Trashman may refer to the following:

Trashman (character), a fictional character and eponymous comic book created by Spain Rodriguez
Trashman (video game), a 1984 video game for the ZX Spectrum
The Trashmen, a band from Minneapolis, Minnesota
Waste collector, the occupation